KRDW-LP (107.3 FM) is a radio station licensed to Smith River, California, United States, serving the Crescent City area. The station is currently owned by Calvary Chapel of the Redwoods.

References

External links
Query the FCC's FM station database for KRDW-LP
 

Radio stations established in 2002
RDW-LP
RDW-LP
2002 establishments in California